Edirisooriya Mohottilage Kaushini Nuthyanga Heram Senavirathna (born 5 August 2002, known as Kaushini Nuthyangana) is a Sri Lankan cricketer.

International career
In June 2022, Nuthyangana named in Sri Lanka's Women's One Day International (WODI) and Women's Twenty20 International (WT20I) squad for the series against India.

In September 2022, she was named in national squad for the Women's Asia Cup. She made her WT20I debut on 2 October 2023 against UAE in Women's Asia Cup 2022 at Sylhet International Cricket Stadium Academy Ground, Sylhet.

In February 2023, she was named in Sri Lanka's squad for the 2023 ICC Women's T20 World Cup in South Africa.

References

External links
 
 

2002 births
Living people
Cricketers from Colombo
Sri Lankan women cricketers
Sri Lanka women One Day International cricketers
Colts Cricket Club women cricketers